Aztec Adventure, known in Japan as , an action video game that was developed and published by Sega for the Master System.

In the game, the player takes the control of Niño, an adventurer who must traverse a maze in search for treasures. While the original Japanese version depicts the adventure in Nazca, the story and title were later changed to be based in Aztec settings for international releases, though the elements of the former culture, including the Nazca Lines, can still be seen. The player is not the only one in search for those treasures, three other adventurers controlled by the computer will try to foil his plans.

Gameplay

Gameplay involves the player trying to reach Paradise by exploring ten different lands, including  desert, marshes, ruins, underground waterways and forest. While exploring you can collect weapons, by destroying enemies. A variety of in-game weapons can be found (fireballs, arrows, tornadoes, etc.), some more powerful than others. Some weapons can be used against bosses, which can take a certain number of hits from the player's default weapon, unless he has companions. The player's companions need to be hired with gold, and until he pays them they remain his enemies. The more powerful the companion, the more gold he requires to join the player's quest.

References

External links

1987 video games
Aztecs in fiction
Master System games
Master System-only games
Sega video games
Video games based on Native American mythology
Video games developed in Japan